The Lola T86/00 is an open-wheel racing car chassis, designed and built by Lola Cars that competed in the CART open-wheel racing series, for competition in the 1986 IndyCar season. It won a total of 3 races that season, with Al Unser Jr. taking 1 win, and Mario Andretti taking 2 wins. It was powered by the  Ford-Cosworth DFX.

References 

Open wheel racing cars
American Championship racing cars
Lola racing cars